Križ is a village in the Municipality of Komenda in the Upper Carniola region of Slovenia.

Castle

Križ Castle or Križ Manor used to stand on a small hill above the settlement. It was built in the second half of the 16th century. In 1918, Križ Castle was owned by the Austrian aristocrat Baron Otto von Apfaltrern. The castle was burned down and demolished by the Partisans in November 1943. It contained many valuable works of art; some were burned by the Partisans and others were looted.

Church

The local church is dedicated to Saint Paul.

References

External links

Križ on Geopedia
Otto, Freiherr von Apfaltrern sen.

Populated places in the Municipality of Komenda